Bever is a river of North Rhine-Westphalia, Germany. It flows into the Weser in Beverungen.

History 
On December 1, 2006, the water became contaminated after a slurry accident. A fist-sized crack in the fermenter of the Biogas Plant in Borgentreich-Natzungen brought large quantities of fermentation substrate into the Eselsbach and thus into the Bever, causing a massive fish die out. Trout, eels, grayling, crayfish, and other aquatic animals died, which also affected the adjacent fishpond sites.

See also
List of rivers of North Rhine-Westphalia

References

Rivers of North Rhine-Westphalia
Rivers of Germany